Maureen C. O'Connell (born May 23, 1950) is the County Clerk of Nassau County, New York, an adjunct faculty member of the Adelphi University School of Nursing, and a member of the School of Nursing Advisory Boards of Nassau Community College, Molloy College, and State University of New York at Farmingdale.

Education
O'Connell attended Mineola High School. A registered nurse, she is a graduate of the Flushing Hospital and Medical Center School of Nursing and holds a B.S. in Health Care Administration from St. Joseph's College. O'Connell is also an attorney, with a Juris Doctor from St. John's University School of Law.

Political career
O'Connell served as a Trustee and as Deputy Mayor of the Village of East Williston from 1991 through 1998.

Prior to her taking office as County Clerk on January 1, 2006, O'Connell served as the first woman to be sent by the 17th District to the New York State Assembly, where she served as ranking member of the Assembly's Health Committee and on the Judiciary, Insurance and Ethics Committees.  She was also a member of the Sexual Assault and Violence Education (S.A.V.E.) taskforce on sex crimes and violence against women and children. She serves on the board of directors of the St. John's University School of Law Alumni Association and the Maternity & Early Childhood Foundation.

In January 2007, O'Connell was selected as the Republican, Conservative, and Independence candidate for the open 7th State Senatorial District in a special election, called by Governor Eliot Spitzer to fill the vacancy created by the resignation of Senator Michael A.L. Balboni.  Her opponent was Democrat Craig Johnson, a County Legislator who was strongly endorsed by former governor Eliot Spitzer.  The polls closed February 6, 2007 with Johnson defeating O'Connell.

Personal life
O'Connell lives in East Williston with her husband Don. They have one son.

New York State election results
 November 1998 general election, NYS Assembly, 17th AD
{| class="Wikitable"
| Maureen C. O'Connell (REP - CON) || ... || 25,124
|-
| Richard V. Mannheimer (DEM - LIB) || ... || 10,389
|-
| Joseph Cascio (RTL) || ... || 1,311
|}

 November 2000 general election, NYS Assembly, 17th AD
{| class="Wikitable"
| Maureen C. O'Connell (REP - IND - CON) || ... || 28,804
|-
| Emil L. Samuels (DEM - LIB - WOR) || ... || 16,829
|-
| Walter J. Beagan (RTL) || ... || 1,588
|-
| Elizabeth L. Henley (GRE) || ... || 372
|}

 November 2002 general election, NYS Assembly, 17th AD
{| class="Wikitable"
| Maureen C. O'Connell (REP - IND - CON) || ... || 25,965
|-
| Thomas E. Sobczak (DEM) || ... || 10,494
|-
| Joseph P. Cascio (RTL) || ... || 1,138
|-
| Jacqueline A. Maron (LIB) || ... || 189
|}

 November 2004 general election, NYS Assembly, 17th AD
{| class="Wikitable"
| Maureen C. O'Connell (REP - IND - CON) || ... || 35,465
|-
| Anthony A. Pellegrino (DEM - WOR) || ... || 21,859
|}

 February 2007 special election, NYS Senate, 7th SD
{| class="Wikitable"
| Craig M. Johnson (DEM - WOR) || ... || 27,632
|-
| Maureen C. O'Connell (REP - IND - CON) || ... || 23,995
|}

References

External links
Office of the Nassau County Clerk

1950 births
Living people
Place of birth missing (living people)
American nurses
American women nurses
Farmingdale State College
Republican Party members of the New York State Assembly
People from East Williston, New York
St. Joseph's College (New York) alumni
St. John's University School of Law alumni
Women state legislators in New York (state)